This is a list of awards and nominations received by New Girl, an American sitcom television series that premiered on Fox on September 20, 2011. Developed by Elizabeth Meriwether under the working title Chicks & Dicks, the series revolves around offbeat teacher Jess (Zooey Deschanel) after her moving into an L.A. loft with three men, Nick (Jake Johnson), Schmidt (Max Greenfield), and Winston (Lamorne Morris); Jess's best friend Cece (Hannah Simone) and old-turned-new loftmate Coach (Damon Wayans, Jr.) also appear regularly.

Awards and nominations

References

External links
 

Awards
Lists of awards by television series